,  is a marine products company based in Japan. It had annual revenues of US$5.1 billion in 2014.Until November 30, 2022, the company name will be .  The company was established in 1911, and is a commercial fishing and marine product procurement corporation. Its goal is to “Establish a global supply chain of marine products.”

The company is the second-largest of its kind in Japan after Maruha Nichiro Holdings and owns Gorton's, a US frozen seafood company, among other companies. The company is listed on the Tokyo Stock Exchange and is constituent of the Nikkei 225 stock index. Its main competitors are Maruha Nichiro and Kyokuyo Co., Ltd.

Its former headquarters, built in Tobata (Kita Kyushu) in 1929, is now an exhibit center.

In 2005, the company divested its whaling fleet following controversy for its role in the modern global whaling industry (see Whaling in Japan).

As of 2013, the company has 61 subsidiaries and 44 associated companies across Japan, Australia, New Zealand, Asia, Europe and North and South America.

History
 1908 – Founder Ichiro Tamura constructed Daiichi-Maru (199 gross tons), the first steel-frame trawler in Japan
 1911 – Ichiro Tamura established the Tamura Steamship Fishery Division in Shimonoseki, Yamaguchi Prefecture, and started trawling in cooperation with Kosuke Kunishi and other people (foundation of Nippon Suisan)
 1920 – Hayatomo Fishery Research Group, the first private fishery research organization in Japan, was established
 1929 – The base of fishery moved from Shimonoseki to Tobata, Fukuoka Prefecture
 1934 – First whaling expedition conducted in the Antarctic Ocean
 1937 – Company name changed to Nippon Suisan
 1946 – First postwar whaling expedition conducted in the Antarctic Ocean with permission of the General Headquarters (GHQ)
 1949 – Nippon Suisan listed its shares on the Tokyo Stock Exchange
 1952 – North Sea fisheries reopened and NISSUI's mother ship-type salmon and trout fleet began fishing.
 1966 – Head office moved to the present address (Nippon Building in Chiyoda-ku, Tokyo)
 1974 – Unisea founded in the U.S
 1978 – EMDEPES founded in Santiago, Chile, as a fishery base
 1988 – NISSUI acquired Salmones Antartica, a salmon and trout aquaculture company in Chile
 1990 – NISSUI obtained approval to make "EPA-E NISSUI," a drug substance
 1995 – involved in financing a management-buyout of ANZCO Foods (just over 25% shareholding; minor partner to Itoham Foods), a meat producer in New Zealand
 2001 – Acquired 50% of shares of Sealord, a fishery company in New Zealand
Acquired from Unilever Gorton's and Blue Water, pre-cooked frozen seafood brands for household use in North America
 2002 – Acquired 25% of shares of Alaska Ocean Seafood
 2004 – Founded NAL Peru, a procurement company specializing in fish meat and fish oil, in Lima, Peru
Founded Europacifico, a marketer of marine products, in Vigo, Spain
 2005 – Acquired King & Prince Seafood, a U.S. company of pre-cooked frozen seafood for business use
 2006 – Acquired three marketers of marine products: Nordic Seafood in Denmark, F.W. Bryce in the U.S. and Nordsee in Brazil
 2007 – Acquired shares of Cité Marine S.A.S., a processed seafood company in France
DOSA was established in Chile in order to administrating, marketing, and distributing for group fishery companies in Chile
 2008 – Qingdao Nissui Food Research and Development founded
Acquired 25% of shares of Glacier Fish Company
Hokkaido Fine Chemicals Co., Ltd. founded
 2009 – TN Fine Chemicals Co., Ltd. founded
Acquired Hokkaido Fine Chemicals Co from Nikkashi
 2010 – Acquired shares of Delmar
Nordic Seafood A/S becomes consolidated subsidiary
 2011 – Opening The Nissui Pioneer Exhibition Center
2012 – The Medium-Term Management Plan 2014(MVIP) was initiated.
2013 – "Yumigahama Suisan Co.,Ltd" was established for domestic Coho Salmon farming.
2014 – Head office moved to Nishi-Shimbashi Square in Minato-ku, Tokyo.
 2015 – Nissui sells part of its shareholding in ANZCO Foods to Itoham Foods
 2018 – Nissui sells remaining part of its shareholding in ANZCO Foods to Itoham Foods
 2019 – Acquired 75% of shares of Flatfish Ltd

See also
 Fishing industry in Japan

References

External links
 Company website 
 Yahoo! Finance company profile

Companies listed on the Tokyo Stock Exchange
Food and drink companies based in Tokyo
Food and drink companies established in 1911
Fuyo Group
Japanese companies established in 1911
Whaling firms